The 2019 BetVictor World Cup of Darts was the ninth edition of the PDC World Cup of Darts. It took place from 6–9 June 2019 at the Barclaycard Arena in Hamburg, Germany.

The Dutch pairing of Michael van Gerwen and Raymond van Barneveld were the reigning champions, after beating the Scottish duo Peter Wright and Gary Anderson 3–1 in the 2018 final. Although Van Gerwen was able to defend his title, Jermaine Wattimena was selected ahead of Van Barneveld for the Netherlands. However, they lost 2–1 to the Republic of Ireland in the semi-finals.

Wright and Anderson of Scotland won their first World Cup, defeating the Republic of Ireland team of William O'Connor and Steve Lennon 3–1 in the final.

Format
The tournament remained at 32 teams this year, with the top 8 teams being seeded and the remaining 24 teams being unseeded in the first round. Like last year, there are no groups in 2019 with the tournament being a straight knockout.

First round: Best of nine legs doubles.
Second round, quarter and semi-finals: Two best of seven legs singles matches. If the scores are tied a best of seven legs doubles match will settle the match.
Final: Three points needed to win the title. Two best of seven legs singles matches are played followed by a best of seven doubles match. If necessary, one or two best of seven legs singles matches in reverse order are played to determine the champion.

Prize money
Total prize money will rise to £350,000, £50,000 more than last year.

The prize money will be per team:

Teams and seedings
The competing nations were confirmed on 29 March, with the only change from 2018 being the Philippines replacing Thailand. Later on 8 May, it was confirmed that Lithuania would replace Switzerland. The teams were fully confirmed on 12 May. On 5 June, it was confirmed that China's Qingyu Zhan was to be replaced by Yuanjun Liu due to a passport issue.
 
The Top 8 nations based on combined Order of Merit rankings on 12 May were seeded. 

Seeded nations

Unseeded nations

Results

Draw

Second round
Two best of seven legs singles matches. If the scores were tied, a best of seven legs doubles match settled the match.

Quarter-finals
Two best of seven legs singles matches. If the scores were tied, a best of seven legs doubles match settled the match.

Semi-finals
Two best of seven legs singles matches. If the scores were tied, a best of seven legs doubles match will settle the match.

Final
Three match wins were needed to win the title. Two best of seven legs singles matches followed by a best of seven doubles match. If necessary, one or two best of seven legs reverse singles matches were played to determine the champion.

References

2019
World Cup
PDC World Cup of Darts
Sports competitions in Hamburg
PDC World Cup of Darts